Clinton Commercial Historic District may refer to:

 Clinton Commercial Historic District (Clinton, Arkansas)
 Clinton Commercial Historic District (Clinton, North Carolina)
 Clinton Commercial Historic District (Clinton, South Carolina)

See also
Clinton Historic District (disambiguation)